The Queens Silver Knights team was a college football representing Queens College, New York, USA, from 1972 to 1974.

History
The team gained approval in 1970 to begin play, but could not because of lack of funding. A team was approved for 1971, but no games were played. The team was disbanded in 1974 because of "mismanagement" by the head coach, Tony Cruz.

References

 
American football teams established in 1972
American football teams disestablished in 1974
1972 establishments in New York City
1974 disestablishments in New York (state)
Queens College, City University of New York